Dirty Rotten Scoundrels is a 1988 American comedy film directed by Frank Oz and starring Steve Martin, Michael Caine and Glenne Headly. The screenplay was written by Dale Launer, Stanley Shapiro, and Paul Henning. It is a remake of the 1964 Marlon Brando/David Niven film Bedtime Story, also written by Shapiro and Henning, and was later remade in 2019 as The Hustle, starring Anne Hathaway and Rebel Wilson.

The film tells the story of two con men competing to swindle an heiress out of $50,000. Caine plays educated and suave Lawrence Jamieson, who stages elaborate ruses to con rich women, while Martin plays his less refined, small-time rival, Freddy Benson. It takes place on the French Riviera. The film was released on December 14, 1988 and received positive reviews from critics.

Plot
Lawrence Jamieson is an intelligent and sophisticated British con artist operating in the fictional town of Beaumont-sur-Mer on the French Riviera. With the help of manservant Arthur and amoral police official Andre, he seduces wealthy women and cons them out of money by posing as a prince in exile trying to raise money for his country's "freedom fighters." His only concern is another con artist known as "The Jackal" who has been reported in the area.

While on a train, Lawrence crosses paths with small-time American hustler Freddy Benson, who brags about his meager accomplishments at conning rich women out of money with a sob story about a sick grandmother. Worried that Freddy's inexperienced antics will scare away his prey, Lawrence attempts to trick Freddy into choosing a different destination, then has him arrested and put on a plane out of town. However, after Freddy meets one of Lawrence's former marks, he blackmails Lawrence into taking him on as a pupil.

Lawrence attempts to teach Freddy style and refinement, with limited success. He then involves Freddy in his cons, having him play his mentally challenged brother Ruprecht to scare away women Lawrence has seduced (and now, in the new con, proposed to). When Lawrence refuses to give Freddy a cut of the profits, Freddy angrily quits but refuses to leave town.

Lawrence is unwilling to share his territory with Freddy, so the two agree on a bet: the first to con $50,000 out of a selected mark wins, and the other must leave town. They target new arrival Janet Colgate, the naïve "United States Soap Queen". Freddy poses as a psychosomatically crippled U.S. Navy veteran who needs $50,000 for treatment by the celebrated psychiatrist Dr. Emil Schaffhausen of Liechtenstein. When Janet shows sympathy to Freddy, Lawrence poses as Dr. Schaffhausen and agrees to treat Freddy but stipulates that Janet pay the $50,000 fee directly to him.

Lawrence discovers that Janet is not actually a soap heiress, having won her vacation and "Soap Queen" title in a sweepstakes; nevertheless, she plans to liquidate most of her assets to pay for Freddy's treatment. Lawrence attempts to call off the bet, as he only cons wealthy marks. Freddy counters with a new bet: Janet herself, with the first in bed with her declared the winner. Lawrence is disgusted and refuses to seduce Janet, but agrees that should Freddy fail with Janet, he wins.

Under the guise of continuing Freddy's treatment, Lawrence dances with Janet and taunts Freddy, raising the ire of some nearby British sailors, whom Freddy convinces to waylay Lawrence. He rushes to Janet's hotel room, where he demonstrates his love by standing and walking to her. However, Lawrence has secretly been present the whole time and declares Freddy cured. Ushering Freddy out of the room, he explains that the sailors released him after discovering that he is a Royal Naval Reserve officer. Lawrence puts Janet on a departing plane and leaves the sailors with Freddy, who realizes that he lost the bet, but enjoys the merry drinking with them.

However, Janet instead returns to her hotel room and finds Freddy there. She declares her love for him, and they kiss and begin undressing. Andre reports this to Lawrence, who accepts his defeat with grace. He waits for Freddy to return and gloat over his victory, but instead Janet arrives in tears and says that Freddy stole the money her father sent. Disgusted, Lawrence calls Andre to have Freddy arrested, gives Janet a bag containing $50,000 of his own money, and takes her to the airport.

Before her plane departs, Janet returns Lawrence's bag, refusing to take what isn't hers. Andre arrives with Freddy, who claims that Janet stole his wallet and clothes. Lawrence disbelieves him, pointing out Janet's honesty in returning the $50,000. Opening his bag, he finds that the money has been replaced with Freddy's clothes and a note wherein Janet reveals herself to be the Jackal. Freddy is furious, while Lawrence is impressed.

The following week, Freddy and Lawrence contemplate their loss at Lawrence's villa. They are about to part ways when Janet, posing as a New York City real estate agent, arrives in a yacht filled with wealthy people. She prompts the shocked Lawrence and Freddy to assume roles in her scheme and, after sending her guests off to refresh themselves, takes the pair aside and announces that while she made three million dollars the previous year, "[their] fifty thousand was the most fun." Joining arms, they set out to fleece their latest victims.

Cast

Production

Pre-production
The 1988 version similarly underwent casting changes. It started as a possible vehicle for Mick Jagger and David Bowie, who approached Dale Launer to write a screenplay for them. Launer suggested a remake of Bedtime Story. Launer acquired the rights for the remake, but Bowie and Jagger dropped out to do a movie with Martin Scorsese. According to Bowie, they were "a bit tweezed that we lost out on a script that could have been reasonably good." According to Splitsider, Eddie Murphy was considered for the role of Freddy Benson. John Cleese was also approached for the role of Jamieson, but declined. He admitted in a 2008 interview that he regretted doing so.

Richard Dreyfuss was also sent a script. Though he was intended for the part of Benson, a misunderstanding resulted in him preparing the part of Jamieson, so Steve Martin (who had also been asked to play Jamieson) read Benson's part instead. Oz was excited by Martin's version of Benson, and settled on this choice. Michael Caine was eventually chosen to play Jamieson. Palin wrote in his diary that Caine was "probably the nearest he (Oz) will get in an English actor to the effortless charisma of Niven."

Filming

Production of the film began on June 6, 1988 and lasted through early August, finishing "six days ahead of schedule." Filming locations included Antibes, Cannes, Beaulieu-sur-Mer (depicted in the film as "Beaumont-sur-Mer"), Saint-Jean-Cap-Ferrat, Nice and Villefranche-sur-Mer. The Villa Ephrussi de Rothschild was visited by the leading characters in a scene. The estate belonging to Lawrence is a private villa (Villa Hier) located at the tip of the Cap d'Antibes.

Release

Theatrical
Prior to the film's December 14, 1988 theatrical release in the United States, it premiered at the Los Angeles County Museum of Art on December 5. The studio held test screenings of the film in early October, one for a blue-collar audience and one for "more upscale", with both receiving high marks.

Home media
In a DVD extra providing a behind-the-scenes look at the making of the film, Frank Oz discusses a teaser trailer he directed for the studio, which he wanted to use for promotion before there was enough actual footage to assemble a trailer. An entire day was spent filming a scene in which Freddy and Lawrence stroll along the promenade, politely moving out of the way of other people, until Freddy casually pushes an elderly woman into the water and Lawrence nonchalantly shoves a little boy's face into his cotton candy.

Reception

Box office
The film grossed $3.8 million from 1,466 theaters in its opening weekend, finishing fifth at the box office. In total it grossed $42 million in the US.

Critical response

According to the review aggregator website Rotten Tomatoes, 89% of critics gave the film a positive review based on 44 reviews, with an average rating of 7/10. The site's critics consensus called the movie "buoyant [and] clever" and praised Caine and Martin's chemistry. At Metacritic, the film has a weighted average score of 68 out of 100 based on 14 critics, indicating generally favorable reviews. Audiences polled by CinemaScore gave the film an average grade of B+ on an A+ to F scale.

Roger Ebert of the Chicago Sun-Times wrote that while the film was predictable, Martin and Caine's chemistry was enjoyable and "Headly provides a resilient foil." Variety called it "wonderfully crafted" and "absolutely charming" and praised the editing and music. Echoing other critics, Vincent Canby of The New York Times commended Cain and Martin's partnership and the film's divergence from "mistimed and misdirected comedies" from that time.

Musical adaptation

Remake

Metro-Goldwyn-Mayer has produced a remake of the film with Rebel Wilson, Anne Hathaway and Alex Sharp, titled The Hustle.

References

External links
 
 
 
 
 
 
 

1980s American films
1980s crime comedy films
1980s English-language films
1988 comedy films
1988 films
American buddy comedy films
American crime comedy films
films about con artists
films adapted into plays
films directed by Frank Oz
films scored by Miles Goodman
films set on the French Riviera
films shot in France
films with screenplays by Dale Launer
Orion Pictures films
remakes of American films